The Apple Hill Center for Chamber Music is a center of chamber music performance and teaching, founded in 1971 and situated on  of fields and woodlands in Nelson, New Hampshire, in the United States.

History 
The Apple Hill Center for Chamber Music was founded in 1971. The Apple Hill String Quartet was founded in 2007, performing both traditional and new music.

In 2015, the Apple Hill Center for Chamber Music won the "CMAcclaim Award" from Chamber Music America.

About 
It is stewarded today by the organization's director, Leonard Matczynski, and ensemble-in-residence, the Apple Hill String Quartet. These professional musicians present concerts and educational workshops throughout the world and, during the summer, teach and coach chamber music to participants of all ages and levels at Apple Hill's Chamber Music Workshop.

Each summer, Apple Hill welcomes 300 students and 45 faculty to the Workshop program. Over 12,000 students have attended since the early 1970s.

References

External links 
Apple Hill website

Chamber music
Music venues in New Hampshire
Education in Cheshire County, New Hampshire
Buildings and structures in Cheshire County, New Hampshire
Tourist attractions in Cheshire County, New Hampshire
Organizations established in 1971
1971 establishments in New Hampshire
Nelson, New Hampshire